Aaron Williams (born April 10, 1993), best known as DJ A-Tron, is an American DJ, radio host, web personality, event producer, entrepreneur and marketing executive. He was referred to by the LA Weekly as "The Twerk King". His business portfolio also includes a creative marketing and branding agency, management company, as well as an online jewelry store, The Work Shop.

Early life 
When A-Tron was seven years old, he realized he loved to DJ and got his first set of turntables. He started DJing a lot more as he got older. He DJed in clubs and house parties.

A-Tron uses the DJ software Serato. A-Tron started creating mixes online. Starting on air at the age of 16 on his own internet radio show JerkinRadio which covered more than jerkin and also about being open and proud of who he was to the city, A-Tron split time as a teen between school and music. After graduating from St. Bernard High School (Los Angeles, California) in 2011, A-Tron started headlining at Hollywood clubs and throwing massive underground functions.

DJ career 
Performing, A-Tron has toured worldwide, and performed at official events for the GRAMMY Awards, and BET Awards.

JerkinRadio is an internet radio station A-Tron opened in 2008 while in high school. The station grew to 100,000 monthly listeners due to endorsements from the jerkin scene's major figures.

A-Tron does many celebrities kids birthday parties and tours High School around California. He also performed at SXSW in Austin, Texas.

As a mixtape DJ and producer, A-Tron has released many mixtapes during his career. In 2013, A-Tron released "Skinny Ni**as" featuring Nipsey Hussle. It was announced in 2013 that A-Tron would release his debut mixtape with features from Nipsey Hussle, Joe Moses, TeeFlii, among others. 
XXL (magazine) called DJ A-Tron "The Most Popular underground DJ" in Los Angeles.

Business career 
Outside of his career as a DJ and personality, A-Tron is active in the entertainment business as a business entrepreneur working with Fox Sports and multi-platinum production band 1500orNothin.

In September 2013, A-Tron opened his online retail jewelry store, The Work Shop.

References

External links

1993 births
African-American record producers
American hip hop DJs
American hip hop record producers
Living people
Musicians from Los Angeles
Record producers from California
West Coast hip hop musicians
21st-century African-American people